Stroud and Thornbury was a county constituency represented in the House of Commons of the Parliament of the United Kingdom. It elected one Member of Parliament (MP) by the first past the post system of election.

The constituency was created for the 1950 general election and abolished for the 1955 general election.

Boundaries
The Urban Districts of Nailsworth and Stroud, the Rural Districts of Dursley, Stroud, and Thornbury, and in the Rural District of Gloucester the civil parishes of Arlingham, Brookthorpe, Eastington, Elmore, Frampton-on-Severn, Fretherne with Saul, Frocester, Hardwicke, Harescombe, Haresfield, Longney, Moreton Valence, Quedgeley, Standish, Upton St Leonards, and Whitminster.

Members of Parliament

Election results

See also 
 List of parliamentary constituencies in Gloucestershire

References

Stroud District
Parliamentary constituencies in South West England (historic)
Constituencies of the Parliament of the United Kingdom established in 1950
Constituencies of the Parliament of the United Kingdom disestablished in 1955
Politics of Gloucestershire

ar:ستراود (دائرة انتخابية في المملكة المتحدة)
pl:Okręg wyborczy Stroud
zh:斯特勞德 (英國國會選區)